School Hill is an unincorporated community in the town of Meeme located in Manitowoc County, Wisconsin, United States. School Hill is located in southern Manitowoc County along County "X" at its intersections with Marken Road and County "M".

Geography
School Hill is located at  (43.949444, -87.892778).

Images

References

Unincorporated communities in Wisconsin
Unincorporated communities in Manitowoc County, Wisconsin